Albion Senior High School was a secondary school located in Albion, Michigan which served students in grades 9–12. It was a part of Albion Public Schools. As of 2006, the school principal was Ms. Debra Swartz. Albion was known for its traditionally strong boys basketball and track and field programs. The school board announced on June 11, 2013, that all Albion High School students would be attending Marshall High School starting in the fall of 2013. The decision was made to close Albion Senior High School because of a $1.1 million deficit. The local school board decided to re-purpose the school's infrastructure as the district's only elementary school; the school board said that this would result in a saving of $900,000.

References

External links
 Albion Public Schools webpage
 Albion High School: Class of 1905, Morning Star newspaper.  June 12, 2005, p. 2.
 Albion Senior High School at schoolsineachstate.com

Public high schools in Michigan
Albion, Michigan
Schools in Calhoun County, Michigan
2013 disestablishments in Michigan
Former high schools in Michigan
Defunct schools in Michigan
1967 establishments in Michigan